Bob Whitney may refer to:

Bob Whitney, character in Jungle Woman
Bob Whitney, character in Overland Stage Raiders

See also
Robert Whitney (disambiguation)